

Players

Competitions

Division Two

League table

Results summary

League position by match

Matches

FA Cup

Worthington Cup

LDV Vans Trophy

Appearances, goals and cards

References

Northampton Town F.C. seasons
Northampton Town